Slovenia returned to the Eurovision Song Contest in 2001 with Nuša Derenda and the song "Energy". The song was selected as the Slovene entry after it won the Slovene national final, EMA 2001.

Before Eurovision

EMA 2001 
EMA 2001 was the 6th edition of the Slovenian national final format Evrovizijska Melodija (EMA). The competition was used by RTV Slovenija to select Slovenia's entry for the Eurovision Song Contest 2001.

Format 
EMA 2001 consisted of a semi final on 23 February 2001 and a final on 24 February 2001. Twenty-two artists competed in EMA 2001. In the semi-final, 12 songs qualified to the final as six songs were selected by the Slovenian public and the other six songs were selected by the jury. In the final, the combination of points from a public vote, an expert jury and a jury composed of members from the Entertainment Program of RTV Slovenija determined the winner.

Semi-final
The semi-final of EMA 2001 took place on 23 February 2001 at the RTV Slovenija studios in Ljubljana, hosted by Mojca Mavec. Twelve acts qualified for the final: six entries were chosen with the most votes cast by the viewers and six other finalist entries were selected by the jury.

Final
The final of EMA 2001 took place on 24 February 2001 at the RTV Slovenija studios in Ljubljana, hosted by Mojca Mavec, Miša Molk and Marcel Štefančič. The combination of points from a public vote, a four-member jury panel and a RTV Slovenija jury selected "Ne, ni res" performed Nuša Derenda as the winner. The jury panel consisted of Aleš Strajnar, Jaka Pucihar, Mojmir Sepe and Mojca Menart. The winner of the public vote was "Ostani tu" performed by Karmen Stavec, however only came third overall.

At Eurovision
At Eurovision Derenda performed "Ne, ni res" in English as "Energy". On the night of the contest Derenda perform 17th in the running order, following the United Kingdom and preceding Poland. The Slovene votes were calculated through a public televote held after all songs had performed.

At the close of the voting, Slovenia, which had been one of the heavy favorites to win prior to the event, received 70 points, placing 7th in a field of 23 countries. This was, and still is as of 2022, Slovenia's best place at Eurovision, along with Darja Švajger's "Prisluhni mi" from 1995.

Voting

References

External links
Slovene National Final 2001

2001
Countries in the Eurovision Song Contest 2001
Eurovision